Rabila is a genus of moths of the family Noctuidae erected by Francis Walker in 1865. The genus was once thought to endemic to Sri Lanka, but species have been found from South India and few African countries.

Description
Its eyes are naked and without lashes. The proboscis is obsolete. Palpi porrect (extending forward) and evenly scaled. Third joint long and frons with a rounded corneous projection. Antennae of male simple with short branches. Thorax and abdomen without tufts and tibia lack spines. Neuration normal. Forewings with produced and rounded apex, where the outer angle slightly hooked.

Species
 Rabila albiviridis Hampson, 1916
 Rabila frontalis Walker, 1865

References

Hadeninae